Unessential Listening is a 2-disc compilation album by the comedy duo Hamish & Andy. It features segments included on their radio show between 2006 and 2008. 

At the ARIA Music Awards of 2009, the album won the ARIA Award for Best Comedy Release].

Track list 
Disc one 
High Arse Crack
Adam And Eve
Albino Song
Inflight Magazine
Daarvid
Hill Related Sayings
Red Headucation Week
Blast From The Past: Andy's A Woman
Kamahl Calls From Heaven
Upset Girlfriends
Edward Scissorhands The Musical
Shopkeepers Trick
The Worst Lyrics Of All Time
Greg's Dog
Rent-a-baby
Eating Plan
Telemarketers
Science
Bum Roll On
$360 Billion Cheque
Defending The Base In Afghanistan
Cats
Party Fouls
Jack's Betrayal
Airport Toilets
Supporting Call Centres
Horgs' Inventions
John Farnham The Musical
Hab's
Dad's Vendetta
The Aussie Star Wars
Sex Excuses Song
Food Delivery
Blast From The Past: Hamish's Urine Sample
Nanny
Ghost At The Palace Hotel
The Pope-mobile
Ribena Berry Apology
Pamela Anderson
The Happy Country & Western Song
Bad Management Fads
The First Ever Radio Prank
Andy's Deposit

 Disc two 
Save The Pandas
Hottest 100 Ads
John Bucknell Trio
Shops Closing
Security Guards
Faker Song
Horgs' Thoughts
Shooting Cannons In Afghanistan
Love Songs And Dedications
Blast From The Past: Andy Is A Lord
Moosie's Affair
Dentist
5 Second Memory Call
Boonie
Phone Flirt
Hamish & Andy Are Music
Awesome April Fools' Day Prank
Jingles
The People's Chip
Todd McKenney's Defence
Lisp
Lie Detector Test
Name & Shame Game
Cure For Cancer
Adopt An Attention Seeker
Beijing Ceremony
Honest Love Song
Memoirs Of A Geezer
Fosca
Two Voices One Person Call
Steve Curry's Logie Hunt
Lying Instructional Video
Adult Toy Party
Hi-tech Pope
Box Hedges
Blast From The Past: Hamish's Psychic Prediction
Nurse
Pete Blanks
Japanese Soft Ball
Photo Surprise
Ray Martin's Not Boring
Black & Gold
Unessential Bonus Track

Charts

Weekly charts

Year-end charts

Certifications

See also
Hamish & Andy (radio show)

References

Hamish & Andy albums
2008 compilation albums
ARIA Award-winning albums